Těšany is a municipality and village in Brno-Country District in the South Moravian Region of the Czech Republic. It has about 1,300 inhabitants.

Notable people
Roman Sedláček (born 1963), football player and coach

References

External links

 

Villages in Brno-Country District